The Coligny calendar is a bronze plaque with an inscribed calendar, made in Roman Gaul in the 2nd century CE. It lays out a five-year cycle of a lunisolar calendar, each year with twelve lunar months. An intercalary month is inserted before each 2.5 years. The lunar phase is tracked with exceptional precision, adjusted when necessary by a variable month, and the calendar uses the 19-year Metonic cycle to keep track of the solar year. It is the most important evidence for the reconstruction of an ancient Celtic calendar. 

It was found in 1897 in France, in Coligny, Ain (near Lyon), along with broken pieces of a bronze statue of a life-size naked male holding a spear, likely Roman Mars or Romano-Celtic Lugus. It is written in Latin inscriptional capitals and numerals, but terms are in the Gaulish language. Based on the style of lettering and the accompanying statue, the bronze plaque probably dates to the end of the second century, although the copying errors indicate the calendar itself is much older. It is now held at the Gallo-Roman Museum of Lyon-Fourvière.  

Eight small fragments of a similar calendar were found at the double-shrine of Villards-d'Héria.  It does not have the holes of a peg calendar that the Coligny calendar does, but otherwise has the same notations. It  is now held in the Musée d'Archéologie du Jura at Lons-le-Saunier.

List of months
The names occur in the form SAMONI (gen.), DUMANNI, RIVRI etc. in the internal notations of the calendar. The name of the first intercalary month is unknown being on a lost fragment, the second is reconstructed as[ S]antaran[...], [R]antaran[...], [B]antaran[...], or Antaran[...]. 

 refers to summer (Gaulish ,< *sṃHo-3) while  refers to winter (Gaulish ). These two months divide the calendar into summer and winter seasons of six months, each season led off by a festival of several days marked with IVOS.  This indicates an early version of the same traditional seasons as seen in later Celtic contexts:  “For two divisions were formerly on the year, viz., summer from Beltaine (the first of May), and winter from Samuin to Beltaine”.

It is not possible to align the Coligny lunar months accurately with modern solar months, but allowing for variation across the years it is likely that the month of MID SAMONIOS began around May–June.

The lunar month
The Coligny calendar as reconstructed consisted of 16 columns and 4 rows, with two intercalary months given half a column each, resulting in a table of the 62 months of the five-year cycle. The 5 years of the calendar plaque is part of a Metonic cycle of 19 years, although it could also be extended to a 30-year cycle.  The full length of the calendar is still being debated.

Each lunar year has a 12 lunar months, six months of 30 days and five of 29 days, although not in 29/30 pairs, and one variable month of 29 or 30 days.   A synodic month has 29.53 days, so the calendar overcomes any slight slippage or temporary imbalance by the month of MID EQVOS having either 29 or 30 days as required to keep the calendar in sync with the lunar phase.

The Coligny calendar is designed to keep perfectly in sync with the lunar phase, with a tolerance of less than 24 hours.  Its internal notations are organised according to the phase of the moon. 

At the end of the 19-year Metonic cycle, the calendar has overrun the 62-month lunar point by 0.312 days. This would be fixed by reducing an EQUOS month from 30 days back to 29 once every 61 years. 

If the plaque was part of a 30-year calendar, it overruns the lunar phase by 0.151 days. This requires a day to be removed (by turning a 30-day EQUOS into a 29-day) roughly once every 198 years. However, the internal months show a larger variation in accuracy for the lunar phase, nearly 48 hours (1.44 to -0.65 ), making the ability to track the lunar phase of 30-years notably less accurate.

The solar year
The calendar is based on the Metonic cycle, a period of 19 years after which the sun and moon complete their phase within about two hours, 0.087 days, of each other.  This is created by 4 Coligny plaques, with the first year dropped.

All the days and their notations are luni-solar and move around within a space of 36 days.

The calendar itself must count in whole days, so 6940 days overruns the sun by 0.398396 and the moon by 0.311620 days. 

The functioning of the calendar relies on the lunar months staying in sync with the lunar phase, so the calendar is already adjusting for any lunar difference through the use of the variable day in EQVOS. To keep in sync with the solar year it only needs to adjust for the difference of 0.087 days.  Every 276 years this adds one day, but as all the notations are luni-solar and move around within 36 days, this extra solar day would be unnoticeable for many centuries. Eventually the calendar would require a 30-day lunar month to be skipped once every 6,536 years.

A full cycle of 19 or 30 years 

The calendar can perform as a 30-year cycle, by extending the 19-year Metonic cycle to use six  5-year cycles, with a 30-day intercalary month dropped once every 30 years.  But whether it was a 19-year or 30-year calendar is unknown. 

Pliny stated that the Celts treated 30 years as an ‘age’, and this period is seen many times in stories. But it does not necessarily follow that the calendar was then based on a 30-year cycle.  If the calendar was a 30-year cycle, the luni-solar swing would be 46 days, meaning that the timing of festivals would often be inappropriate to their seasonal nature.  For example, Lugnasad might find itself in the middle of the busy harvest. 

In a 30-year calendar, the moon finishes only 0.1515 days earlier than the calendar, requiring a day to be removed from EQVOS every 199 years. But the lunar/solar difference is larger at 1.4172 days, requiring a 30-day month to be skipped every 198 years. This relatively fast slippage against the solar year would also add to the already large luni-solar swing, for a total of 75 days before a possible adjustment, further aggravating the solar discrepancy, and displacing seasonal festivals by up to two and a half months. This slippage and inaccuracy indicates that the Coligny calendar is more likely to be a practical 19-year calendar rather than a 30-year cycle.

The start of the lunar month

The calendar month is broken into two halves with the term ATENOVX between them. The first half-month has 15 days (called a cóicthiges ‘fifteen-days’ in Old Irish, coicise in modern Irish).
  The second half-month has either 15 days, or 14 days with the term DIVERTOMV placed over the space for the 15th day. The notation patterns act as though this 'virtual' 15th day is present.

Pliny reported that the Celtic month began on the ‘6th day of the new moon’.   

The mistletoe, however, is but rarely found upon the oak; and when found, is gathered with rites replete with religious awe. This is done more particularly on the sixth day of the moon, the day which is the beginning of their months and years, as also of their ages, which, with them, are but thirty years. This day they select because the moon, though not yet in the middle of her course, has already considerable power and influence; and they call her by a name which signifies, in their language, the all-healing.

Classical writers counted from the day of the first visible moon, so the 6th day would be the first quarter moon, Day 1, the start of the calendar’s month.  The quarter moon with its D-shape is the only moment in the lunar phase that is easily identifiable by eye. The internal notations of the calendar confirm Pliny’s statement, with a  focus on the middle triplet of days in each half-month, days 7-8-9 (the full moon) and days 7a-8a-9a (the dark invisible moon).  

The first coicise tracks the gibbous moon, the phase in which the moon is more than half full, it’s brightest half.  The second coicise tracks the crescent moon, the darker half.   Notations, which will govern activities, usually focus in the first, brighter, coicise when the moon has ‘considerable power and influence’.  Every odd day in the darker coicise is marked as ‘inauspicious day’.

FULL RECONSTRUCTION
A full reconstruction of the calendar by McKay (2020) includes the latest information about the intercalary notations and the triple marks.   Olmsted (2001). offers a previous reconstruction, which usefully aligns the notations with photographic images. RIG III (1986) presented an earlier in-depth description of terms with a reconstruction.

Sample month
MID SAMONIOS of year 2 is the only month out of 62 that has been preserved without any gaps. Currently, most of the patterns of the various notations are known, even if their significance may not be understood. Because of this, most days on the calendar can be reconstructed with confidence.

The month begins with M[ID] SAMON[I] MAT, the 'month of SAMONIOS lucky'.

The double circle "◎" in the table indicates the peg-hole for marking the current day, followed by a Roman numeral for the day's number in the half-month. 

All days here were originally marked as   'lucky day' because SAMONIOS is marked as a  month in its header, but this will often be subsequently overwritten by other notations  'day' (neutral),  'unlucky day', or   'night' as they are added in turn. 

Terms are often shortened, and the spelling is non-standard and often varies. 

These follow the same offset pattern as the  notations, and likely divide the daytime into three periods.

Days 5 and 11 in the upper coicise and each odd day (except day 1a) in the lower coicise are marked with   'inauspicious day'.

The notation  occurs in this month on days 8a and 9a. The significance of this nighttime term in unknown. 

The name of the following month, is marked on days 1, 3, 8 and 1a. This tracks the swapping of these days' notations (all of them) with the following month DUMANIOS days 1, 8, 1a and 2a where the notations from SAMONIOS have  added in their turn. Day 2a, first swapped with DUM day 2a, then undergoes another anomalous swap with SAM day 3. Days with notations that have been moved are always marked with their originating month's name (and day name if different).  

The notation  sits in  months marked , at the first day of the first month (Samonios), the second day of the second  month (Rivros), and so on for 8 instances. Another  originally at SAMONIOS day 1 has been swapped with DVMANNIOS day 1 below it .  

(SAMONIOS day 2a's original notations are found in turn at DUMMANIOS day 2a).
 
This run of  started on the last two days of the previous month CANTLOS, days 13a-14a, so the whole festival lasts for 5 days.

Finally, Day 1 has its 'day' terms overwritten by a single , without changing the rest of its notations. This single  indicates that the notations of SAMONIOS day 1 in this year 2, have been used to help create the notations of Intercalary Two day 1.

THE NOTATIONS
Several different notations, each with their own pattern, are placed sequentially on the 12 lunar months of the calendar, interacting according to certain rules with the notations before them, often replacing them.  After the basic notations are set, many days’ notations are then moved to other days, creating visual chaos.   Finally, the days of the intercalary months are filled with notations copied from certain days in the 12 yearly months.

The notations, their patterns and interactions have gradually over the last century been identified by several key researchers, and what follows is a general, but not comprehensive, overview of each notation.

numbering the days
Each month has two halves. The first half has days numbered from I-XV (1-15). The second half has either I–XV (1-15), or I- XIIII (1-14) with the 15th day marked with DIVERTOMU.   The term ATENOVX is placed between the two half-months.  The patterns of the notations act as though the 30th day is always present.  This means that in practice some months only have 29 days, but conceptually, all months have 30 days.

MAT and ANM months and their days
Months of 30 days were marked  (except EQVOS), months of 29 days were marked  (except Intercalary One).  and  have been read as "lucky" and "unlucky", respectively, based on comparison with Middle Welsh mad and anfad and Old Irish mad and ni-mad.

 Six months are marked in their header as MAT ‘good, auspicious’, and six months as ANM[AT] ‘not good’.  The summer season has 4 MAT months, and the winter season only has 2 MAT months. The summer season needs more auspicious time for all its activities. The months do not run in 29/30 pairs.

For months marked as MAT, all days are initially given M D, a good or auspicious day.  Days of the months marked as ANM are given just D, a neutral day.  
The terms M D and D refer to daylight hours and are in apposition to N for night.  Any type of notation marked with N (night) will overwrite the full daytime notation, including the triple mark, M D, D, or D AMB.

the notation D AMBRIX RI

D AMBRIX RI, usually shortened to D AMB, denotes an inauspicious day.  It occurs only on Days 5 and 11 in the upper half-month, that being the period when the moon is more than half full, so it’s mostly left free of inauspicious days.  In the second half-month, D AMB is placed on every odd numbered day except Day 1, but this is explained by the traditional view that the unit 1 is neither odd nor even. The use of odd numbers as inauspicious is also seen with most months of 29 days being ANMAT ‘not good’.   It is symptomatic of Celtic cultures, as the Romans held the reverse view, that odd numbers were auspicious.

triple marks
 The triple marks are a series of ogham-like marks. They are first lain down each month in triplets over three days, ƚıı, ıƚı, or ııƚ, followed by three days with none.   As they only occur with days marked with D (for daytime), and never N (for nighttime), they likely divide the daytime into three divisions. 

The triple marks are by far the most complex notations, composed of three main patterns. They do not always repeat across the years. The first pattern assigns possible triplet positions which start on the same offset as the first PRINI term in the month, moving down a day in each of the following MAT or ANM months.  The first triplet starts on Days 1-2-3 of SAMONIOS in Year 1, Days 2-3-4 in RIVROS, and so on following the MAT sequence of months.  The equivalent sequence starts on Days 1-2-3 of GIAMONIOS in Year 3 and follows the ANM months, so mirroring one intercalary period to the other. 

If a triplet cannot be completed before the end of a coicise because it starts on Days 14 and 15, or 14a and 15a, or just 14a of a 29-day month, then the triple marks changes to NSDS and DSNS. If a triplet starts only on day 15, or day 15a, then it changes to a single N.  

A second pattern, again following the MAT/ANM sequence, determines which triplets of the first pattern will manifest from year to year.  This means the triple mark on a day/month of one year may not be found on the same day/month in another year.

A third pattern adds another IIT on Day 21(6a), the last day of the visible moon, adding to another mark if already there, resulting in each Day 21 holding either TIT, ITT, or IIT. 

The triple marks undergo many changes as other notations are added.   Days with N forms of notation overwrite the whole ‘day’ notation, e.g. IIT MD becomes just N, while ITI D AMB becomes just N.  Days are moved and exchanged, often overwritten and lost, intercalary borrowed days are marked with N, and so on.  The result turns a complex pattern of triple marks into visual chaos.

the notations PRINI LOUD and PRINI LAG
PRINI LOUD has the same MAT month offset, and PRINI LAG the same ANM month offset, as the triple marks.  If it falls on a triple mark, it replaces it, along with any M D, D, or D AMB. The PRINI LOUD of SIM 5 is  later overwritten by N INIS R.   Exchanges will lead to some PRINI LOUD ending up in ANM months, and vice versa. PRINI LOUD does not only occur in the SAMONIOS season, and PRINI LAG does not only occur in the GIAMONIOS season - the SAMONIOS season of 6 months, and the GIAMONIOS season, both contain examples of PRINI LOUD and PRINI LAG.

the notation N INIS R
The term N INIS R is scattered across the lunar year.  The significance of its distribution is undiagnosed.  All but three instances occur in the seven months of the SAMONIOS season plus the month of GIAMONIOS. It avoids the days marked with IVOS ‘festival’.  As it occurs on seven nights when the moon is absent in the sky (the dark moon of 7a-8a-9a), and avoids the critical moments of the full moon of day 8 and the first visible moon of day 10a, it possibly refers to prognostication associated with stars.

the notations IVOS and SINDIV IVOS
The term IVOS ‘festival’ occurs in several runs of days of between three to nine days each, considered to mark each day of a festival.  In all but two cases these festivals run from the end of one month into the beginning of the next.  Four of these IVOS runs break the year into 4 quarters, just as the four main Celtic festivals do in historic times, only here they are centered on Day 1 every three lunar months, rather than Day 1 of every three solar months as today.  

There are also three other IVOS festivals on the calendar. 

The term SINDIV IVOS ‘this day a festival’, occurs only 3 times – DUM 2a, SIM 9, and AED 25. These three special festival days must indicate something of exceptional importance in the year.

the notation TIOCOBRIXTIO
TIOCOBRIXTIO is an exceptional term which only occurs on 3 days in the year – SIM 7, AED 8, and CAN 15.   Whatever its significance, it marks days of exceptional importance.

Movement of notations between days
At this point, most notations have been assigned their base position on the calendar.  What happens next is a major feature of the calendar, the movement of one  day’s notations to a different day.  This visually breaks up the patterns of the notations, making the calendar seem quite random.  This exchanging of days according to several different patterns, is a major aspect of the calendar, involving a total of 870 days over 5 years.

EXCHANGES: swapping notations between two days 
There are several patterns in which two days swap their notations.  
 The first pattern only involves Day 1 in four pairs of months.  
 The second pattern involves days other than Day 1, and uses a different set of four pairs of months to swap between.  Days are swapped with the same day of  a neighbouring month.
 A third pattern is called the anomalous swaps, where days are swapped between a different day of a month. This occurs just three times per year: between SAM 3 and SAM  2a,  between RIV 4 and RIV 10a, and between RIV 8a and ANA 4.

As the notations of one day are moved to another, they take the information with them about their original position (presumably so that one day can be used to prognosticate for its swapped partner).  As most movements are to the same day of the month, the day information is redundant, so only the month name (in the genitive) is added.  But anomalous swaps between different days require both their original day name and the month to be added.

EXCHANGES: dragging notations between months
  
For the 12 lunar months after an intercalary month, the notations of the triplet of days 7-8-9 (the full moon) and 7a-8a-9a (the dark moon) in each month are dragged sequentially upwards to the previous month, like beads on a string.  Their original month name is then added to the notations.  

The notation IVOS is also sequentially dragged upwards a month in the post-intercalary year.  However, it does not take all the other notations with it.  This keeps the festival runs marked with IVOS intact. The same also applies to SINDIV IVOS.

Footnotes

References

Bibliography
 Delamarre, Xavier (2003). Dictionnaire de la langue gauloise: une approche linguistique du vieux-celtique continental. 2nd edition, Paris, Editions Errance. .
 Dottin, Georges, La langue gauloise : grammaire, textes et glossaire (1920) no. 53, pp. 172–207.
 Duval, Paul-Marie and Pinault, Georges (eds) (1986). Recueil des inscriptions gauloises (R.I.G.), Vol. 3: Les calendriers de Coligny (73 fragments) et Villards d'Heria (8 fragments). Paris, Editions du CNRS.
 Hitz, Hans-Rudolf (1991). Der gallo-lateinische Mond- und Sonnen-Kalender von Coligny.
 Joyce, P.W. (2000). "Old Celtic Romances". The pursuit of the Giolla Dacker and his horse. Wordsworth Editions Limited, London.
 Laine-Kerjean, C. (1943). "Le calendrier celtique". Zeitschrift für celtische Philologie, 23, pp. 249–84.
 Delamarre, Xavier (2003). La langue gauloise. Paris, Editions Errance. 2nd edition. . Chapter 9 is titled "Un calandrier gaulois".
 Le Contel, Jean-Michel and Verdier, Paul (1997). Un calendrier celtique: le calendrier gaulois de Coligny. Paris, Editions Errance. 
 Mc Cluskey, Stephen C. (1990). "The Solar Year in the Calendar of Coligny". Études Celtiques, 27, pp. 163–74.
 McKay, Helen (2016). “The Coligny calendar as a Metonic lunar calendar”. Études Celtiques, XLII, pp. 95–122.
 McKay, Helen (2018). “Defining the systematic patterns for the triple marks of the Coligny calendar”. Études Celtiques, XLIV, pp. 91–118.
 McKay, Helen (2022). “Building the Intercalary Months of the Coligny calendar”. Études Celtiques, XLVIII, pp. 55–78.
 Mac Neill, Eóin (1928). "On the notation and chronology of the Calendar of Coligny". Ériu, X, pp. 1–67.
 Monard, Joseph (1996). About the Coligny Calendar. privately published monograph.
 Monard, Joseph (1996). Découpage saisonnier de l'année celtique. privately published monograph.
 Monard, Joseph (1999). Histoire du calendrier gaulois : le calendrier de Coligny. Paris, Burillier. 
 Olmsted, Garrett (1992). The Gaulish calendar: a reconstruction from the bronze fragments from Coligny, with an analysis of its function as a highly accurate lunar-solar predictor, as well as an explanation of its terminology and development. Bonn: R. Habelt. 
 Parisot, Jean-Paul (1985). "Les phases de la Lune et les saisons dans le calendrier de Coligny". Études indo-européennes, 13, pp. 1–18.
 Pinault, J. (1951). "Notes sur le vocabulaire gaulois, I. Les noms des mois du calendrier de Coligny". Ogam, XIII, pp. 143–154
 Rhys, John (1910). "The Coligny Calendar". Proceedings of the British Academy, 4, pp. 207–318.
 Thurneysen, Rudolf (1899). "Der Kalender von Coligny". Zeitschrift für celtische Philologie, 2, pp. 523–544
 Zavaroni, Adolfo (2007). On the structure and terminology of the Gaulish calendar, British Archaeological Reports British Series.

External links 
 The Gallic calendar – Lugdunum Museum

Specific calendars
Archaeological artifacts
2nd century in Roman Gaul
Celtic archaeological artifacts
Gaulish inscriptions
2nd-century inscriptions
1897 archaeological discoveries
Archaeology of France